Cecilia Nilsson (born 29 April 1966) is a Swedish orienteering competitor. She is Relay World Champion from 1997, as a member of the Swedish winning team. She also has a silver medal from 2001.

References

External links
 
 

1966 births
Living people
Swedish orienteers
Female orienteers
Foot orienteers
World Orienteering Championships medalists
21st-century Swedish women